Chilliwack Airport  is located adjacent to Chilliwack, British Columbia, Canada.

Airport facilities

The airport is used by both private pilots and commercial air operators and has services and modification facilities for different types of aircraft.

Chilliwack Flight Fest
Every year in the last week of August the airport hosts an event known as the Chilliwack Flight Fest, a free air show. Aviation enthusiasts are encouraged to fly their own aircraft.

Airport restaurant

The Airport Coffee Shop at Chilliwack airport operated sporadically from the opening of the airport until it was purchased in the 1970s by Neil and Kathleen McNeill. The restaurant allowed pilots to radio ahead before landing and order a meal, similar to truck stop cafes of that era.

The McNeills sold the coffee shop in 1975, and it and the old airport were torn down soon afterward, replaced with a fully modern airport. After remaining closed for several years, Barbara and Gordon Mitchell purchased the Airport Coffee Shop in 1980. Canadian Owners and Pilots Association (COPA) granted an honorary pair of pilot's wings to Barbara in 1994 for her pies and "Food for Flying Folk".

In 2017, the cooks who have been cooking with the same recipes were now running the business with a large new patio overlooking the airport and the mountain vista.

The Airport Restaurant & Patio continues to be well known among pilots and Chilliwack residents for its food, especially its pies and hamburgers. After periods of sporadic activity, the restaurant has now been in continuous operation for over 32 years.

See also
 List of airports in the Lower Mainland

References

External links

Page about this airport on COPA's Places to Fly airport directory
Chilliwack Municipal Airport Website Official Page
Chilliwack Flight Fest Official Page

Certified airports in British Columbia
Transport in Chilliwack
Lower Mainland